Lac-Moselle is an unorganized territory in the Outaouais region of Quebec, Canada. It is one of the five unorganized and unpopulated wilderness areas in the La Vallée-de-la-Gatineau Regional County Municipality. It is named after Lake Moselle.

References

Unorganized territories in Outaouais